The 1943 Bainbridge Naval Training Station Commodores football team represented the United States Naval Training Center Bainbridge, Maryland during the 1943 college football season. The team compiled a 7–0 record, outscored opponents by a total of 313 to 7, and was ranked No. 17 in the final AP Poll. Joe Maniaci was the team's head coach.

Schedule

Roster
Bainbridge's 1943 roster was loaded with star players from the college and professional ranks.  Its backfield included:
Charlie Justice, halfback, who was later a two-time All-American at North Carolina, played four years in the NFL, and was inducted into the College Football Hall of Fame;
Bill DeCorrevont, back, later played five years in the NFL;
Harvey Johnson, fullback who later played five years of professional football and coached the Buffalo Bills;
Hilliard Cheatham, back out of Auburn; and
Don Durdan, back out of Oregon State.

Its line included:
Buster Ramsey, guard, an All-American at William & Mary in 1942 who was later inducted into the College Football Hall of Fame, and who also played in the NFL and was named to the NFL 1940s All-Decade Team;
Len Akin guard, played for the Chicago Bears in 1942;
Red Hickey, end, played for the Pittsburgh Steelers in 1941 and later coached the San Francisco 49ers;
Lou Sossamon, who went on to play for the New York Yankees;
Phil Ragazzo, who played in the NFL from 1938 to 1941;
Woody Gerber, who played for the Philadelphia Eagles in 1941 and 1942;
Carl Tomasello, end, played for the New York Giants in 1941;
Clure Mosher, center, played for the Pittsburgh Steelers in 1942; and
Carl Mulleneaux, end, played for the Green Bay Packers in 1942.

References

Bainbridge
Bainbridge Commodores football seasons
College football undefeated seasons
Bainbridge Commodores football